The scalloped woodcreeper (Lepidocolaptes falcinellus) is a species of bird in the ovenbird family.

It is found in southeastern Brazil, eastern Paraguay and far northeastern Argentina.

Its natural habitats are subtropical or tropical moist lowland forest and subtropical or tropical moist montane forest.

References

scalloped woodcreeper
Birds of the Atlantic Forest
scalloped woodcreeper
Taxonomy articles created by Polbot